Erythraeidae is a family of mites belonging to the Trombidiformes. Larval forms of these mites are parasitic on various other arthropods, for example harvestmen, but the adults are free-living predators. These oval mites are rather large, usually reddish coloured and densely hairy. The legs, especially the first and fourth pairs, are long and adapted for running. They have either one or two pairs of eyes and can be distinguished from related families microscopically by the presence of a single claw on the tibia of the palp.

The larvae bite a hole into the cuticula of the host and use a stylostome, which acts like a drinking straw, to drink body fluids dissolved tissues.

The larvae of two described species of Leptus feed on bees: Leptus ariel lives on the European honey bee in Guatemala, and Leptus monteithi is a parasite of a Leioproctus species (Colletidae) in Tasmania.

Footnotes

References
Meyer, Magdalena K. P. & Ryke, P. A. J.: Nine new species of the superfamily Erythraeoidea (Acarina: Trombidiformes) associated with plants in South Africa. Acarologia I.
Joel Hallan's Biology Catalog: Erythraeidae

External links
 InsectImages.org: Pictures of a Leptus sp.

Trombidiformes
Taxa named by Anthonie Cornelis Oudemans
Acari families